A medal ribbon, service ribbon or ribbon bar is a small ribbon, mounted on a small metal bar equipped with an attaching device, which is generally issued for wear in place of a medal when it is not appropriate to wear the actual medal. Each country's government has its own rules on what ribbons can be worn in what circumstances and in which order. This is usually defined in an official document and is called "the order of precedence" or "the order of wearing."  In some countries (particularly in North America and in Israel), some awards are "ribbon only," having no associated medal.

Design 

The service ribbon for a specific medal is usually identical to the suspension ribbon on the medal. For example, the suspension and service ribbon for the U.S. government's Purple Heart medal is purple with a white vertical stripe at each end (see photo).

However, there are some military awards that do not have a suspension ribbon, but have an authorized ribbon and unit award emblem. The Soviet Order of Victory is a badge that was worn on the military parade uniform. However, a ribbon bar representing the Order of Victory was worn on a military field uniform.

Colors
Ribbon bars come in a variety of colors. In the case of the U.S. government, it maintains a specific list of colors used on its ribbons, based on the Pantone Matching System and Federal Standard 595 color systems:

Construction 

There is a variety of constructions of service ribbons. In some countries, service ribbons are mounted on a "pin backing", which can be pushed through the fabric of a uniform and secured, with fasteners, on the inside edge. These ribbons can be individually secured and then lined up, or they can be all mounted on to a single fastener. After the Second World War, it was common for all ribbons to be mounted on a single metal bar and worn in a manner similar to a brooch. Other methods of wearing have included physically sewing each service ribbon onto the uniform garments.

Display 

"Orders of wearing" define which ribbons may be worn on which types of uniform in which positions under which circumstances. For example, miniature medals on dinner dress, full medals on parade dress, ribbons on dress shirts, but no decorations on combat dress and working clothing.  Some countries (such as Cuba) maintain a standard practice of wearing full service ribbons on combat utility clothing. Others strictly prohibit this. These regulations are generally similar to the regulations regarding display of rank insignia and regulations regarding saluting of more senior ranks. The reasoning for such regulations is to prevent these displays from enabling opposing forces to easily identify persons of higher rank and therefore aid them in choosing targets which will have a larger impact on the battlefield. In times of war, it is not uncommon for commanders and other high value individuals to wear no markings on their uniforms and wear clothing and insignia of a lower ranking soldier. 

Service medals and ribbons are generally worn in rows on the left side of the chest. In certain commemorative or memorial circumstances, a relative may wear the medals or ribbons of a dead relative on the right side of the chest. Medals and ribbons not specifically mentioned in the "Order of wear" are also generally worn on the right side of the chest. Sequencing of the ribbons depends on each country's regulations. In the United States, for example, those with the highest status—typically awarded for heroism or distinguished service—are placed at the top of the display, while foreign decorations (when allowed) are last in the bottom rows. When medals are worn (typically on the left side of a shirt or jacket), ribbons with no corresponding medals are worn on the right side.

Collecting 
The study, history and collection of ribbons, among other military decorations, is known as phaleristics (sometimes spelled faleristics by users of U.S. English).

See also 
 Phaleristics
 Order (distinction)
 List of military decorations
 Awards and decorations of the United States Armed Forces

References

External links 

 Danish service ribbons

Medals
Ribbon symbolism
Award items